Schloss Frondsberg is a castle in Styria, Austria. Schloss Frondsberg is situated at an elevation of 675 m.

See also
List of castles in Austria

References

This article was initially translated from the German Wikipedia.

Castles in Styria